Hot Coal or Hotcoal was an unincorporated community and coal town located along the Winding Gulf Creek in Raleigh County, West Virginia, United States. Originally, it was named Patterson and later acquired the name Hot Coal. It was the next community past Big Stick on County Route 3/2. Although, the community now no longer exists, the Winding Gulf Bank, now the National Bank at Beckley, resided at Hot Coal and was moved to Beckley on January 1, 1914.  Hot Coal at one time had a Post Office 

Hot Coal was part of the Winding Gulf Coalfield. The community's name origin specifically related to the temperature of the coal when burned, in short, an advertisement of the coal quality. Fireco another unincorporated community located along the Winding Gulf Creek in Raleigh County, West Virginia, United States also has a similar name origin. During the years of 1925-44 it was documented to have mined 1,546,003 tons of coal

External links 
Data on Hot Coal West Virginia by Ms Pauline Haga
Data from Raleigh County West Virginia History asserting move of Winding Gulf Bank to Beckley West Virginia

References 

Coal towns in West Virginia
Winding Gulf Coalfield
Unincorporated communities in West Virginia
Unincorporated communities in Raleigh County, West Virginia
Former populated places in West Virginia